Kent Township is one of twelve townships in Warren County, Indiana, United States. According to the 2010 census, its population was 428 and it contained 196 housing units.

History
Kent Township was created in September 1864 from a section of Mound Township.

Geography
It contains one town, State Line City, which is in the far western part of the township next to the Indiana / Illinois border.

Cemeteries
The township contains Gopher Hill Cemetery and Masonic Cemetery.

Transportation
Both Indiana State Road 63 and Indiana State Road 263 pass through the eastern part of the township from north to south.

A Norfolk Southern Railway line enters the township from Danville, Illinois and passes through State Line City, continuing northeast toward the county seat of Williamsport.

Education
Kent Township is part of the Metropolitan School District of Warren County.

Government
Kent Township has a trustee who administers rural fire protection and ambulance service, provides poor relief, manages cemetery care, and performs farm assessment, among other duties.  The trustee is assisted in these duties by a three-member township board.  The trustees and board members are elected to four-year terms.

Kent Township is part of Indiana's 8th congressional district, Indiana House of Representatives District 42, and Indiana State Senate District 38.

References

 
 United States Census Bureau TIGER/Line Shapefiles

Bibliography

External links

Townships in Warren County, Indiana
Populated places established in 1864
Townships in Indiana